Billtown may refer to:

Places

Americas

United States
 Billtown, Indiana

Canada
 Billtown, Nova Scotia